Creer is a surname. Notable people with the surname include:

 Allan Creer (born 1986), Scottish footballer
 Joseph Creer (1832–1913), Manx-born Australian politician

See also
Center for Radiofrequency Electronics Research of Quebec (Centre de Recherche en Electronique Radiofréquence)